Classic Seven is a seven-room apartment floor plan one can find in buildings built in New York City prior to 1940 consisting of a formal dining room, a living room, a kitchen, three bedrooms, a maid's room, and  two or more bathrooms. Classic Seven is essentially Classic Six with an added bedroom.

Layout 

A maid's room is typical, and is located away from other bedrooms, almost always off the kitchen to allow maids of the past easy access. A typical maid's room also has a small bathroom attached to it.

References 

Apartment types